The Lady Vanishes is a 1938 British mystery thriller film directed by Alfred Hitchcock, starring Margaret Lockwood and Michael Redgrave. Written by Sidney Gilliat and Frank Launder, based on the 1936 novel The Wheel Spins by Ethel Lina White, the film is about a beautiful English tourist travelling by train in continental Europe who discovers that her elderly travelling companion seems to have disappeared from the train. After her fellow passengers deny ever having seen the elderly lady, the young woman is helped by a young musicologist, the two proceeding to search the train for clues to the old lady's disappearance.

The Lady Vanishes was filmed at the Gainsborough Studios in Islington, London. Hitchcock caught Hollywood's attention with the film and moved to Hollywood soon after its release. Although the director's three previous efforts had done poorly at the box office, The Lady Vanishes was widely successful, and confirmed American producer David O. Selznick's belief that Hitchcock indeed had a future in Hollywood cinema.

The British Film Institute ranked The Lady Vanishes the 35th best British film of the 20th century. In 2017, a poll of 150 actors, directors, writers, producers and critics for Time Out magazine saw it ranked the 31st best British film ever. It is one of Hitchcock's most renowned British films, and the first of three screen versions of White's novel to date.

Plot
After visiting the fictional country of Bandrika, English tourist Iris Henderson is returning home to get married, but an avalanche blocks the railway line. The stranded passengers are forced to spend the night at a hotel. In the same predicament are Charters and Caldicott, cricket enthusiasts anxious to see the last days of the Test match in Manchester, and Miss Froy, a governess and music teacher. Miss Froy listens to a folk singer in the street; he is strangled to death by an unseen murderer.

That evening, Iris is bothered by a loud noise from the room above hers. It is caused by Gilbert Redman, an ethnomusicologist who plays the clarinet. She attempts to get him removed from the room, but fails after he confronts her.

The next morning at the railway station, Iris is hit on the head by a large planter dropped from above. Miss Froy helps her onto the train. Also on board are Charters and Caldicott, Gilbert, lawyer Eric Todhunter and his mistress, who is passing herself off as "Mrs. Todhunter." As a result of her injury, Iris faints. She comes to in a compartment with Miss Froy and several strangers. She joins Miss Froy in the dining car for tea. Soon after, they return to their compartment, where Iris falls asleep.

When Iris wakes up, Miss Froy has vanished, and the other passengers deny having seen her. Todhunter pretends not to remember her to avoid drawing attention to his liaison with his mistress. Iris searches for Miss Froy with Gilbert's assistance. Brain surgeon Dr. Hartz says Iris may be suffering from "concussion-related hallucinations." Fearing that any delay would make them miss the cricket match, Charters and Caldicott also claim not to remember Miss Froy. Todhunter's mistress admits to seeing Miss Froy, proving to everyone that she exists.

At the first stop, Dr. Hartz's patient, covered in bandages from tip to toe, is brought aboard on a stretcher and accompanied by a deaf-mute nun. Madame Kummer, dressed exactly like Miss Froy, appears in her place. Now scared that she'll be revealed, Todhunter's mistress says Madame Kummer was Miss Froy. While continuing their search, Iris and Gilbert find Miss Froy's glasses. However, they are attacked by a knife-wielding magician, Signor Doppo, who was in Iris's compartment. They lose the glasses in the chase and the Doppo escapes. After noticing the nun is wearing high-heels, they suspect that Dr. Hartz's patient has been replaced by Miss Froy. Dr. Hartz tells his fellow conspirator, now revealed to be a British woman dressed as a nun, to drug Iris and Gilbert. Convinced they will soon be asleep, Hartz admits to them that he is involved in the conspiracy. The false nun does not follow Hartz's instructions out of loyalty to her fellow countrymen; Gilbert and Iris escape, free Miss Froy and replace her with Madame Kummer.

When the train stops near the border, Dr. Hartz discovers the switch. He has part of the train diverted onto a branch line, where soldiers wait. Gilbert and Iris inform their fellow passengers what is happening. A uniformed soldier boards and requests that they all accompany him. They knock him out and take his pistol. Another soldier fires, wounding Charters in the hand.

During the ensuing gunfight, Miss Froy tells Gilbert and Iris that she must get away as she is actually a spy. Just in case, she gives them a message (encoded in a tune) to deliver to the Foreign Office in Whitehall—the same tune that the murdered street musician performed for her. Miss Froy then runs into the forest and those on the train are not sure whether or not she is shot. Todhunter attempts to surrender, waving a white handkerchief, and is shot dead. Gilbert and Caldicott then commandeer the locomotive, but the knocked out soldier wakes up and threatens the rest of the guests. The nun escapes through a side door and changes the tracks but is shot in the leg; however, Caldicott and Gilbert manage to pull her up into the train before she is left behind.

In London, Charters and Caldicott discover the Test Match has been cancelled due to flooding. Seeing her fiancé from a distance, Iris jumps into a cab with Gilbert. He kisses her. They arrive at the Foreign Office, but in the waiting room Gilbert realizes he cannot remember the vital tune. As they are led into the office, Gilbert and Iris then hear it. The doors open, revealing Miss Froy is playing the tune on a piano.

Cast

 Margaret Lockwood as Iris Henderson
 Michael Redgrave as Gilbert
 Paul Lukas as Dr. Hartz
 May Whitty as Miss Froy
 Cecil Parker as Mr. Todhunter
 Linden Travers as "Mrs." Todhunter
 Naunton Wayne as Caldicott
 Basil Radford as Charters
 Mary Clare as Baroness
  as Hotel Manager
 Googie Withers as Blanche
 Sally Stewart as Julie
 Philip Leaver as Signor Doppo
 Selma Vaz Dias as Signora Doppo
 Catherine Lacey as the Nun
 Josephine Wilson as Madame Kummer
 Charles Oliver as the Officer
 Kathleen Tremaine as Anna

Production

Development
The Lady Vanishes was originally called The Lost Lady, and Irish director Roy William Neill was assigned by producer Edward Black to make it. A crew was dispatched to Yugoslavia to do background shots, but when the Yugoslav police accidentally discovered that they were not well-portrayed in the script, they kicked the crew out of the country, and Black scrapped the project. A year later, Hitchcock could not come up with a property to direct to fulfil his contract with Black, so he accepted when Black offered The Lost Lady to him.

Writing
Hitchcock worked with the writers to make some changes to tighten up the opening and ending of the story, but otherwise the script did not change much.

The plot of Hitchcock's film differs considerably from White's novel. In The Wheel Spins, Miss Froy really is an innocent old lady looking forward to seeing her octogenarian parents; she is abducted because she knows something (without realising its significance) that would cause trouble for the local authorities if it came out. Iris' mental confusion is due to sunstroke, not a blow to the head. In White's novel, the wheel keeps spinning: the train never stops, and there is no final shoot-out. Additionally, the supporting cast differs somewhat; for instance, in the novel, the Gilbert character is Max Hare, a young British engineer building a dam in the hills who knows the local language, and there is also a modern-languages professor character who acts as Iris's and Max's interpreter who does not appear in the film. The cricket-obsessed characters Charters and Caldicott were created especially for the film and do not appear in the novel.

The plot has clear references to the political situation leading up to the Second World War. The British characters, originally trying their hardest to keep out of the conflict, end up working together to fight off the jack-booted foreigners, while the lawyer who wishes to negotiate with the attackers by waving a white flag is shot and killed.

Casting
At first, Hitchcock considered Lilli Palmer for the female lead, but went instead with Margaret Lockwood, who was at the time relatively unknown. Lockwood was attracted to the heroines of Ethel Lina White's stories and accepted the role.

Michael Redgrave was also unknown to the cinema audience, but was a rising stage star at the time. He was reluctant to leave the stage to do the film, but was convinced by John Gielgud to do so. As it happened, the film, Redgrave's first leading role, made him an international star. However, according to Robert Osborne, host of Turner Classic Movies, Redgrave and Hitchcock did not get along; Redgrave wanted more rehearsals, while Hitchcock valued spontaneity more. The two never worked together again.

Alfred Hitchcock can be seen at Victoria Station, wearing a black coat and smoking a cigarette, near the end of the film. The film marks the first appearance of the comedy double-act Charters and Caldicott (played by Naunton Wayne and Basil Radford).

Filming

The film was shot at Islington Studios, Shepherd's Bush and on location in Hampshire at Longmoor Military Camp, the site of the Longmoor Military Railway. It was the first film to be made under an agreement between Gaumont-British and MGM, in which Gaumont provided MGM with some of their Gainsborough films for release in the UK, for which MGM would pay half the production costs if MGM decided to release the film in the US. In the case of The Lady Vanishes, however, 20th Century-Fox handled the American release. Filming was briefly interrupted by an electricians' strike.

Elisabeth Weis contends that Hitchcock's use of sound in The Lady Vanishes uses the "classical style" – that is, that the director eschews expressionistic sounds in favour of sounds heard in a realistic context. For example, when Iris faints on the train, rather than extraneous noises to denote delirium, only the sound of the train is heard. Another striking use of sound is how evil things are often heard before they are shown. The evil doctor Dr. Hartz often is first heard before he appears on screen, representing an aural intrusion "not so much an invasion of privacy as of security".

Reception

Critical reception
When The Lady Vanishes opened in the UK it was an immediate hit, becoming the most successful British film to that date. It was also very successful when it opened in New York. In a contemporary review, the Monthly Film Bulletin described the film as an "out of the ordinary and exciting thriller", praising Hitchcock's direction and the cast, especially Michael Redgrave, Paul Lukas and Dame May Whitty.

The film has retained its popularity; in his review for the BBC, Jamie Russell gave the film four out of five stars, calling it a "craftily sophisticated thriller" and a "cracking piece of entertainment". In his review for BFI Screenonline, Mark Duguid wrote that the film was "arguably the most accomplished, and certainly the wittiest of Hitchcock's British films, and is up there with the best of his American work". Duguid singled out the young writing partnership of Frank Launder and Sidney Gilliat, noting:

The American film critic and historian Leonard Maltin gave the film four out of four stars in his Movie Guide and included the film in his list of 100 Must-See Films of the 20th Century. The Guardian called the film "one of the greatest train movies from the genre's golden era", and a contender for the "title of best comedy thriller ever made". The film frequently ranks among the best British films of all time. On Metacritic, it has a score of 98 out of 100, based on reviews from 17 critics, indicating "universal acclaim". In 2016, Empire ranked the film at No. 82 on their list of "The 100 best British films". In 2022, Time Out magazine ranked the film at No. 54 on its list of "The 100 best thriller films of all time".

Awards and honours
The Lady Vanishes was named Best Picture of 1938 by The New York Times. In 1939, Hitchcock received the New York Film Critics Circle Award for Best Director, the only time Hitchcock received an award for his directing.

Spin-offs

The cricket-obsessed Charters and Caldicott were created for the film, but became popular in their own right, and appeared in a series of films, radio programmes and a much later TV series.

Copyright and home video status
The Lady Vanishes, like all of Hitchcock's British films, is copyrighted worldwide. 
His British films were public domain in the United States for a while. They have been heavily bootlegged on home video. Despite this, various licensed releases have appeared on Blu-ray, DVD and video on demand worldwide from the likes of Network Distributing in the UK and The Criterion Collection in the United States.

See also
 BFI Top 100 British films

References
Citations

Bibliography

 
 

Further reading
 
 .

External links

 
 
 
 
 
 Alfred Hitchcock Collectors’ Guide: The Lady Vanishes at Brenton Film
 The Lady Vanishes essay by Michael Wilmington at the Criterion Collection
 The Lady Vanishes Revisited essay by Robin Wood at the Criterion Collection
 The Lady Vanishes: All Aboard! essay by Geoffrey O'Brien at the Criterion Collection

1938 films
1930s psychological thriller films
1930s spy thriller films
British spy films
British black-and-white films
Films about missing people
Films based on British novels
Films based on mystery novels
Films set on trains
Films set in Europe
Films set in a fictional country
Gainsborough Pictures films
Films directed by Alfred Hitchcock
Films with screenplays by Frank Launder and Sidney Gilliat
British comedy thriller films
1930s English-language films
1930s British films